Kidnapped: In the Line of Duty is a 1995 American television film directed by Bobby Roth and starring Dabney Coleman and Timothy Busfield.

Cast
Dabney Coleman as Arthur Milo
Timothy Busfield as Pete Honeycutt
Lauren Tom as Lily Yee
Tracey Walter as Oliver Tracy
Barbara Williams as Beth Honeycutt
Carmen Argenziano as Buddy Fortune
Henry G. Sanders as Ellis Watley

Production
Filming occurred in Los Angeles.

Reception
John Ferguson of Radio Times awarded the film three stars out of five.

References

External links
 
 

1995 films
1995 television films
Films shot in Los Angeles
Films shot in California
NBC network original films
Films directed by Bobby Roth
Films scored by Christopher Franke
1990s English-language films